Kolej Tuanku Ja'afar (KTJ), is a co-educational international school in Mantin, Seremban District, Negeri Sembilan, Malaysia, founded in 1991. Its Primary School is a day school for pupils between the ages of 4 and 11 while its Secondary School offers boarding for students from the age of 11 to 19. Day schooling is also possible in the Secondary School. It is a British curriculum school.

School affiliations
The school is a member of the Federation of British International Schools in South East Asia (FOBISIA), Association of International Malaysian Schools and the Council of International Schools.

References

1991 establishments in Malaysia
British international schools in Malaysia
Cambridge schools in Malaysia
Educational institutions established in 1991
Seremban District